The 2001 Big West Conference men's basketball tournament was held March 8–10 at Anaheim Convention Center in Anaheim, California.

Utah State defeated  in the championship game, 71–66, to obtain the fourth Big West Conference men's basketball tournament championship in school history.

The Aggies participated in the 2001 NCAA Division I men's basketball tournament after earning the conference's automatic bid.

Format

Eight of the nine teams in the conference participated, with Idaho not qualifying. The top eight teams were seeded based on regular season conference records.

Bracket

References

Big West Conference men's basketball tournament
Tournament
Big West Conference men's basketball tournament
Big West Conference men's basketball tournament